Ivan Karpovich Golubets (8 May 1916 – 25 March 1942) was a Soviet sailor with the Black Sea Fleet. He was posthumously made a Hero of the Soviet Union.

Biography
Ivan Golubets was born in the city of Taganrog on 8 May 1916 into the family of a Ukrainian worker. He worked at the iron and steel factory after 7 years in Taganrog's high school No. 2. 

In 1937, Ivan Golubets enrolled into the Soviet Navy. In 1939, he graduated from the Coast-guard school in Balaklava, and served at the 2nd and in the 1st divisions of the Black Sea Fleet's coast-guard ships in the city of Novorossiysk. He participated in World War II beginning in June 1941, serving as steersman on the corvette (сторожевой корабль) SK-0183 (3rd division of guard-ships), making the brave feat in the spring of 1942 in Sevastopol.

On 25 March 1942 German artillery fired at the Streletskaya Bay, the engine department of another guard ship, SK-0121, was hit and burst into flames. Ivan Golubets took necessary measures for extinguishing the fire. After the second shell hit the Soviet ship, there was an explosion of the fuel tanks, which could lead to the explosion of anti-submarine bombs on board, threatening a chain explosion on other ships in the Bay. Golubets understood the situation and started rolling the anti-submarine depth bombs off the ship, until the last bomb exploded, but many other ships and people's lives were saved. 

On 14 June 1942, Presidium of the Supreme Soviet issued a decree posthumously naming Ivan Golubets the Hero of the Soviet Union.

Places and ships named after Golubets
 in 1948 one of the streets in Taganrog was named after Ivan Golubets;
 one of the streets in Anapa was named after Ivan Golubets;
 in Taganrog, a monument in memory of Golubets was placed in front of Chekhov Gymnasium, where he studied.
 a Ukrainian trawler was named after Golubets;
 in 2005, a minesweeper of the Russian Black Sea Fleet was named after Golubets;
 a Feodosiya-based motor ship was also named after Golubets.

References

Sources
 Шмульян Г.Т. Голубец Иван Карпович // Энциклопедия Таганрога. — Таганрог: Антон, 1998. — С. 232. — .
 И дольше века льётся сталь / Под ред. Н. И. Фартушного. — Ростов-на-Дону: Принт-Сервис, 2006. — 288 с.
 Два века Таганрогской гимназии. — Таганрог: БАННЭРплюс, 2007. — 288 с. — .

1916 births
1942 deaths
Military personnel from Taganrog
People from Don Host Oblast
Heroes of the Soviet Union
Soviet military personnel killed in World War II
Soviet Navy personnel